Walang Tulugan with the Master Showman formerly known as Master Showman Presents, is a Philippine television variety show broadcast by GMA Network. Hosted by German Moreno, along with John Nite, Shermaine Santiago, Jackie Lou Blanco, and Shirley Fuentes, it premiered on February 8, 1997. The show concluded on February 13, 2016, with a total of 977 episodes.

The show is known for its tagline "Walang Tulugan!" It is the longest running late night variety television show in the Philippines.

History

Early years
The show was originally titled Master Showman Presents. It premiered as a late-night variety talk show similar to GMA Supershow in the late 1970s. It had some elements similar to American talk shows. Master Showman was German Moreno's trademark moniker during his reign as one of television's top TV hosts in the early '80s and '90s, thanks to his hosting stints in GMA Supershow and That's Entertainment.

When GMA Network decided to make a title out of his famous moniker, Moreno introduced the catchphrase/tagline "Walang Tulugan!" (No Sleeping!) during the show. Since then the catchphrase has attracted majority of the viewers.

From live to taped
Master Showman originally aired live from the GMA Broadway Centrum at Aurora Blvd. in Quezon City, Philippines. Airing time varies from 11:05 pm at the earliest to 1:05 am at the latest on Saturday night going to Sunday morning. Running time was usually two to three hours, depending on the availability of big-name guests. When the show moved to its present home at GMA Network Center, it had to do away with live broadcast and instead presented taped episodes. The taping usually occurs every other Friday, shooting two episodes from 5 pm to 2 am, depending on the number of guests. The taped episodes now run from one and a half-hour to two hours, ending not later than 3 in the morning.

Re-branding of the show
In 2005, Walang Tulugan was incorporated in the show title. The move was welcomed since through the years, Master Showman has been always identified by the public as the "show na walang tulugan" (the show that does not sleep).

Master Showman's death
German Moreno died on January 8, 2016, due to cardiac arrest. A special live tribute episode was aired at Our Lady of Mount Carmel Shrine in Quezon City on January 9, where his wake is being held.

Nora Aunor, a popular Philippine actress, singer, and close friend of Moreno became the temporary main host of the show. In an interview with GMA News, Aunor said that she is willing to continue the advocacy of her close friend and to help establish the careers of young aspirants that wish to join Philippine showbiz.

After more than 19 years of its long-run, Walang Tulugan aired its final episode on February 13, 2016, after a month since Kuya Germs' death.

Cast

 German Moreno 

Co-hosts
 John Nite 
 Mariz Ricketts 
 Billy Crawford 
 Shalala 
 Shermaine Santiago 
 Shirley Fuentes 
 Hero Angeles 
 Martha Joy 
 Jackie Lou Blanco 
 Mico Aytona
 Jake Vargas 
 Marlo Mortel 
 Michael Pangilinan 
 Hiro Peralta 
 Teejay Marquez 
 PJ Valerio
 Derek Viray
 Ken Chan 
 Eian Rances 
 Kokoy de Santos
 Vince Gamad 
 Jak Roberto 
 Mara Alberto
 Sanya Lopez 
 Boobsie 
 Rob Gomez 
 Buboy Villar 
 Renz Valerio 
 Pauline Aguilar 
 Prince Villanueva 
 Rhen Escaño 
 Ali Asistio 
 Dale Rossly 
 Lloyd Abella
 Vince Camua
 Jacob Danan
 Sharmaine Santos
 Lance Gutierrez
 Renato Ramos, Jr.
 Emil Paden
 Per Paden
 KD Rossly
 Angelo Carreon
 Jolo Romualdez
 Kassie De Guzman
 Marika Sasaki
 Trisha Bernales
 Mart Catacutan
 Franz Nichols
 Anjo Alfonzo
 Claire Borja
 Earl Santos
 Delmar Cruz
 John Patrick Picar
 Yna Uy
 Jose Konrado Amedo
 Jameelah Bowden

Segment hosts
Aster Amoyo 
Hideaki Torio 
John-na Chuchi 
Mega Oohlala 
Fresh

Groups
UPGRADE
 Rhem Enjavi
 Mark Baracael
 Armond Bernas
 Ivan Lat
 Casey Martinez
 Miggy San Pablo
 Raymond Tay

Detour
 JC Cruz
 Dell Ramirez
 Allan Santarin

Segments
 Barkadahan
 Celebrity Talk
 Diva Dingdings
 Eh Kasi Ewan
 Fan Kita
 John Ka Na Naman
 LSS: Love Song Para Sa'Yo
 OPM GreatsRatings
According to AGB Nielsen Philippines' Mega Manila household television ratings, the final episode of Walang Tulugan with the Master Showman'' scored a 3.3% rating.

Accolades

References

External links
 
 

1997 Philippine television series debuts
2016 Philippine television series endings
Filipino-language television shows
GMA Network original programming
Philippine variety television shows